The blue-backed conebill (Conirostrum sitticolor) is a species of bird in the family Thraupidae (Tanager).
It is found in Bolivia, Colombia, Ecuador, Peru, and Venezuela.
Its natural habitat is subtropical or tropical moist montane forests.

Subspecies 
Conirostrum sitticolor cyaneum, Taczanowski, 1875.
Conirostrum sitticolor intermedium, Berlepsch, 1893.
Conirostrum sitticolor pallidum, Aveledo & Perez, 1989.
Conirostrum sitticolor sitticolor, Lafresnaye, 1840.

References

External links 
 ITES link

blue-backed conebill
Birds of the Northern Andes
blue-backed conebill
Taxonomy articles created by Polbot